Lady Godiva Rides Again is a 1951 British comedy film starring Pauline Stroud, George Cole and Bernadette O'Farrell, with British stars in supporting roles or making cameo appearances. It concerns a small-town English girl who wins a local beauty contest by appearing as Lady Godiva, then decides to pursue a higher profile in a national beauty pageant and as an actress.

The film was released in the United States under its original title in 1953 by Carroll Pictures, then was re-released in the United States as Bikini Baby, to capitalize on the profile of supporting player Diana Dors, who was given star billing with the new title.

It also features Joan Collins in her film debut as an uncredited beauty contestant. Ruth Ellis, the last woman to be executed in England, also appears as an uncredited beauty queen. Ruth, who was four months pregnant at the time, had dyed her hair black and had styled it into a bob. Other young starlets in the film included Diana Russell, Dana Wynter (billed as Dagmar Wynter), Anne Heywood (billed as Violet Pretty), Yvonne Brooks, Simone Silva, Jean Marsh and Pat Marlowe. It also featured Sid James in one of his first film roles. Trevor Howard has an uncredited cameo as a cinema patron.

Plot

On a rainy Sunday afternoon in Coventry Johnny takes his girlfriend to the cinema. In the intermission between films, as Johnny gets an ice-cream, she sees an advertisement on-screen asking for girls to compete for the position of Lady Godiva in the annual street festival. She decides she will enter.

Cast

Pauline Stroud as Marjorie Clark 
Bernadette O'Farrell as Janie 
George Cole as Johnny 
Stanley Holloway as Mr. Clark 
Gladys Henson as Mrs. Clark 
John McCallum as Larry Burns
Dennis Price as Simon Abott 
Diana Dors as Dolores August 
Eddie Byrne as Eddie Mooney 
Kay Kendall as Sylvia Clark
Cyril Chamberlain as Harry
Lyn Evans as Vic
Dora Bryan as Publicity Woman
Sid James as Lew Beeson 
Richard Wattis as Casting Director
Renee Houston as Beattie
Arthur Howard as Soap Publicity Man
Michael Ripper as Joe - Stage Manager
Dana Wynter as	Myrtle Shaw
Leslie Mitchell as TV interviewer
Tommy Duggan as a Compere
Felix Felton as a Councillor
Anne Heywood as Dorothy Marlowe, beauty pageant contestant
Alastair Sim as Hawtrey Murington (uncredited)
Googie Withers as Susan Foster (uncredited)
Trevor Howard as a cinema patron extra (uncredited)
Joan Collins as beauty pageant contestant (uncredited)
Ruth Ellis as beauty pageant contestant (uncredited)
Jean Marsh as beauty pageant contestant (uncredited)

Production
The film was inspired by the Miss Kent 1950 beauty competition held at Leas Cliff Hall in Kent. Frank Launder, joint producer of the film with Leslie Gilliatt, was one of the judges in the competition.  Audrey Hepburn tested for the title role but was judged too thin.

The film was originally called Beauty Queen.

The filmmakers reportedly tested over 500 women to play the lead role including Joan Collins and Audrey Hepburn. The actor picked was Pauline Stroud. Her  only previous film experience was as Vera-Ellen's stand-in in Happy Go Lovely (1951). Collins was given a bit part.

It was the first time John McCallum, who was Australian, played an Australian in a British film. Kay Kendall was cast as Stroud's sister after Launder saw her in a BBC play; the film helped revive Kendall's career after London Town.

Filming took place in June–July 1951. The production filmed on location in Folkestone, Kent. The Leas Cliff Hall was used as the location for the beauty competition, and The Metropole was the setting for the seaside hotel hosting the Fascination Soap Pageant. Folkestone West station features in the film for the railway scenes where Marjorie Clark (Pauline Stroud) arrives and meets Dolores August (Diana Dors) and her consorts, Larry and Vic. The now closed Rotunda Amusement Park was also used for the scenes where Larry (John McCallum) and Marjorie visit and go on rides.

Diana Dors appeared in a swimsuit in one scene. She shot two versions – one in a bikini for release in Europe, another in a more conservative swimsuit for release in America. American censors  objected to the content of the film, including the revealing nature of outfits worn by Diana Dors.

Reception
Filmink said Dors "livens up every scene she appears in and her part is too small (she disappears in the second half); once again, the movie would have been better had Dors played the lead."

References

External links

Lady Godiva Rides Again at Letterbox DVD

1951 films
1951 comedy films
British comedy films
Films directed by Frank Launder
Lady Godiva
Films set in England
Films set in London
Films shot in Kent
Films shot at Shepperton Studios
Films scored by William Alwyn
British black-and-white films
Films about beauty pageants
British Lion Films films
London Films films
1950s English-language films
1950s British films